The 2005–06 Omani League was the 30th edition of the top football league in Oman. It began on 9 November 2005 and finished on 19 May 2006. Dhofar S.C.S.C. were the defending champions, having won the previous 2004–05 Omani League season. On Friday, 19 May 2006, Muscat Club won 4-3 at home in their final league match against Dhofar S.C.S.C. and emerged as the champions of the 2005–06 Omani League with a total of 45 points.

Teams
This season the league had decreased from 13 to 12 teams. Al-Ahli Club, Al-Ittihad Club and Al-Khaboura SC were relegated to the Second Division League after finishing in the relegation zone in the 2004–05 season. The three relegated teams were replaced by Second Division League teams Al-Suwaiq Club and Mjees SC.

Stadia and locations

League table

Results

Season statistics

Top scorers

Media coverage

See also
2005 Sultan Qaboos Cup

References

Top level Omani football league seasons
1
Oman